Petri Johannes Varis (born May 13, 1969) is a Finnish former professional ice hockey forward. He was drafted by the San Jose Sharks as their 7th-round pick in the 1993 NHL Entry Draft.

Playing career
Starting his pro career with Karhu-Kissat in the Finnish first division, Varis played his first SM-liiga games with Ässät in the 1991–92 season. After two seasons with Ässät, Varis moved to Jokerit, where he finished his seventh full season in 2005.

With Jokerit, Varis won 4 Finnish championships and 2 European Cups.

In 1997, Varis moved to North America, where he played a season with the Indianapolis Ice in the IHL, as well as a single NHL game with the Chicago Blackhawks. He has also played in the German ice hockey league and the Swiss first and second leagues.

Varis has also represented Finland in international play.

Varis scored 268 goals in SM-Liiga. He also scored 7 goals in 7 games in European Cup.

Awards
 Jarmo Wasama memorial trophy as Best Rookie - 1992
 Matti Keinonen trophy for best +/- in the regular season - 1996
 Jari Kurri trophy for best player during the playoffs - 1996
 Aarne Honkavaara trophy for best goal scorer - 1997
 Veli-Pekka Ketola trophy for most points scored - 1997 and 2001.

Records
 SM-liiga record for most goals scored in the playoffs (12).
 Jokerit all-time scoring leader in points and goals. Second in assists.

Career statistics

Regular season and playoffs

International

See also
List of players who played only one game in the NHL

External links

1969 births
Ässät players
Chicago Blackhawks players
Finnish ice hockey left wingers
Ice hockey players at the 1994 Winter Olympics
Indianapolis Ice players
Jokerit players
Living people
KooKoo players
Medalists at the 1994 Winter Olympics
Olympic bronze medalists for Finland
Olympic ice hockey players of Finland
Olympic medalists in ice hockey
People from Varkaus
San Jose Sharks draft picks
Sportspeople from North Savo